N'Golodiana is a commune in the Cercle of Kolondieba in the Sikasso Region of southern Mali. The principal town lies at Toutiala. In 1998 the commune had a population of 4435.

References

Communes of Sikasso Region